Houlsyke is a hamlet in the Glaisdale civil parish of the Borough of Scarborough, in North Yorkshire, England. It is situated between Danby and Lealholm.

External links 

Webpage about Houlsyke

Villages in North Yorkshire